Sydney Abigail Elinsky (born January 8, 1996) is an American soccer player who plays as a midfielder.

Early life 
Elinsky played in the youth ranks of local development side Cleveland United SC. While attending Rocky River High School, she earned NSCAA All-American honors and was named 2013-2014 Gatorade Ohio Girls Soccer Player of the Year. As a forward she scored a school-record 43 goals in 2013 to help the Rocky River Pirates win their first-ever state championship.

College 
In 2014, she played at the University of Illinois in her freshman year before transferring to the University of North Carolina. As a Tar Heel she predominantly played as holding midfielder although she was noted for her versatility, sometimes playing in defense or as a forward. She majored in exercise and sport science.

Professional career 
Elinsky was drafted in the third round (30th overall) of the 2018 NWSL College Draft by Houston Dash but was released two weeks prior to the start of the season.

In March 2018, she was signed by Orlando Pride to a National Team Replacement contract and made her professional debut on April 15, coming on as a substitute away to Portland Thorns.

In July 2018, Elinsky joined French Division 2 Féminine side ASPTT Albi. She made her debut for the team on September 9, starting in a 3–1 win over ASPV Strasbourg. She scored her first goal for the club on October 6 in a 2–0 win over Toulouse, the start of a three-game scoring streak. She scored a total of six goals in 12 appearances before leaving in December 2018.

Elinsky returned to Orlando Pride for the 2019 season, and was signed to the senior roster on April 10 after impressing new head coach Marc Skinner in preseason. She was waived at the end of the 2020 season and made available on the re-entry wire but was not picked up.

Career statistics

College

Club
.

Honors

College 
North Carolina Tar Heels
 ACC Women's Soccer Tournament: 2017

References

External links 
 NWSL player profile
 UNC bio
 Illinois bio
 

1996 births
Living people
American women's soccer players
North Carolina Tar Heels women's soccer players
Houston Dash draft picks
Orlando Pride players
National Women's Soccer League players
Soccer players from Ohio
People from West Chester, Pennsylvania
People from Rocky River, Ohio
Women's association football midfielders
Illinois Fighting Illini women's soccer players
Rocky River High School (Ohio) alumni
21st-century American women